Community Consolidated School District 62 (CCSD62) operates 11 schools and one early learning center in the city of Des Plaines, Illinois. Locally know as Des Plaines School District 62 serves the communities in Des Plaines and Rosemont.

CCSD62 graduates attend Maine Township District 207.

Schools

Early Learning Center 

 Westerhold Early Learning Center (Preschool - Jr. Kindergarten): Ms. Margarite Beniaris, Program Director

Elementary Schools 

 Central Elementary School (Kindergarten through 5th grade): Mrs. Erica Cupuro, Principal
 Cumberland Elementary School (Kindergarten through 5th grade): Mr. Marc Infante, Principal
 Forest Elementary School (Kindergarten through 5th grade): Ms. Amy Cengel, Principal
 North Elementary School (Kindergarten through 5th grade): Ms. Carolyn Allar, Principal
 Orchard Place Elementary School (Kindergarten through 5th grade): Ms. Jennifer Suarez Bautista, Principal
 Plainfield Elementary School (Kindergarten through 5th grade): Dr. Lisa Bucciarelli-Carlos,  Principal
 South Elementary School (Kindergarten through 5th grade): Ms. Kristin Jares,  Principal
 Terrace Elementary School (Kindergarten through 5th grade): Dr. Bradley J. Stein,  Principal

Middle Schools 

 Algonquin Middle School (5th through 8th grade): Mr. Donald Jones, Principal
 Chippewa Middle School (5th through 8th grade): Ms. Juliana Vissering, Principal
 Iroquois Community School (Kindergarten through 8th grade): Ms. Kelly Krueger, Principal

Demographics and Statistics
The student population is composed of being 37.7% White, 4.2% Black, 41.6% Hispanic, 12.7% Asian, 0.1% Pacific Islander, 0.0% Native American, and 3.5% Multiracial. The student population also has 48.1% of its students living in low income, 33.7% with limited proficiency in English, and 17% of students with IEPs. Only 0.9% of students are homeless, lower than the state average at 2%.

The school district is made up of 408 teachers (all FTE), with 86.7% of teachers being White, 6.6% Hispanic, 4.1% Asian, 0.8% American Indian, 0.8% Multiracial, and 0.5% black. The district has a pupil/teacher ratio of 15:1 with 87.7% of teachers identified as Female and 12.3% identified as Male. The average salary of the teacher is $77,682, 79.8% of teachers have a master's degree or Higher and 20.2% with a bachelor's degree.

The district as a whole has 5 commendable and exemplary schools and 1 underperforming school. The average class size is 19 students and the total school days that the student population experiences is 176 days, just a day short from the state average.

Note: Based on 2020-2021 Illinois School Report Cards.

Leadership
District 62 employs a Board of Education, a superintendent, and an administration to govern the district.

Board of Education 
The Board of Education is made up of seven members that alternate through four-year terms with elections being held every two years. The Board of Education meet each other on the third Monday of every month or on Tuesday if Monday falls on a holiday. The seven members of the Board of Education includes a president, a vice president, 5 other members and a Secretary to the Board of Education.

Current Members 
 Mr. Ronald Burton, president
 Ms. Beth Morley, vice president
 Ms. Stephanie Duckmann, member
 Ms. Tina Garrett, member
 Ms. Elizabeth Massa, member
 Dr. Kelly Morrissey. member
 Ms. Jeanette Weller. member
 Ms. Margaret Goodchild, secretary

Superintendent and Administration 
Dr. Michael A. Amadei serves as the Superintendent of Schools, with the administration consisting of assistant superintendents and directors specializing in curriculum, instructions, and student services.

 Dr. Michael A. Amadei, superintendent of schools
 Mr. Mark Bertolozzi, assistant superintendent for business services
 Ms. Kathleen Kelly Colgan, assistant superintendent for human resources
 Dr. Ellen Swanson, assistant superintendent for student services
 Dr. Laura J. Sangroula, assistant superintendent for instructional services
 Mr. Adam Denenberg, chief technology officer

See also
 Maine Township High School District 207
 Maine West High School - Apart of HSD 207
 Community Consolidated School District 59

References

Footnotes

External links
 Community Consolidated School District 62 website
 Illinois Report Card for D62

School districts in Cook County, Illinois
Des Plaines, Illinois